Bi Jilong(1914-5/30/2007), (original name Bi Qinfang), was a Chinese diplomat and the second Chinese Under-Secretary-General of United Nations.

Early life
Bi was born in Shanghai to a local leading family. His father, Bi Yihong, was a staff member of the embassy of the Qing Dynasty in Singapore, and later the editor of Eastern Times in Shanghai. His maternal grandfather, Yang Yunshi, was in the Consul of the Qing Dynasty to Singapore. Bi's family was losing their financial position during his childhood, and he went to live with his uncle in Yangzhou, where he attended Yangzhou High school. He graduated from National Central University and worked in several agencies of the Nationalist government as well as Yingshi University.

References

1914 births
Chinese military personnel of the Korean War
Nanjing University alumni
National Central University alumni
Diplomats of the People's Republic of China
2007 deaths
People of the Republic of China
People's Republic of China politicians from Shanghai
Educators from Shanghai